Cucumerunio websteri delli is a subspecies of freshwater mussel, an aquatic bivalve mollusc in the family Unionidae, the river mussels.

Distribution 
 New Zealand

References

Hyriidae